In algebra, let g be a Lie algebra over a field K. Let further  be a one-form on g. The stabilizer gξ of ξ is the Lie subalgebra of elements of g that annihilate ξ in the coadjoint representation. The index of the Lie algebra is

Examples

Reductive Lie algebras
If g is reductive then the index of g is also the rank of g, because the adjoint and coadjoint representation are isomorphic and rk g is the minimal dimension of a stabilizer of an element in g.  This is actually the dimension of the stabilizer of any regular element in g.

Frobenius Lie algebra
If ind g = 0, then g is called Frobenius Lie algebra.  This is equivalent to the fact that the Kirillov form  is non-singular for some ξ in g*.  Another equivalent condition when g is the Lie algebra of an algebraic group G, is that g is Frobenius if and only if G has an open orbit in g* under the coadjoint representation.

Lie algebra of an algebraic group
If g is the Lie algebra of an algebraic group G, then the index of g is the transcendence degree of the field of rational functions on g* that are invariant under the (co)adjoint action of G.

References 

Lie algebras